Time and Chance may refer to:

 Time and Chance: Gerald Ford's Appointment with History, the official biography of U.S. President, Gerald R. Ford by James M. Cannon
 Time and Chance (Color Me Badd album), 1993
 Time and Chance (Caldera album), 1978
 Time and Chance, the 1987 memoirs of British prime minister James Callaghan
 Time and Chance (Kim Campbell), a 1996 book by Kim Campbell, former Prime Minister of Canada
 Time and Chance (Penman novel), a 2002 historical novel by Sharon Kay Penman
 Time and Chance: an Autobiography, the autobiography of science fiction and fantasy writer L. Sprague de Camp
 Time and Chance (Timms novel), a novel by Alma Timms